Black Science is an album by saxophonist Steve Coleman and his band Five Elements, recorded in 1990 and released on the Novus label.

Reception

The Austin American-Statesman wrote that "strong modern street music sensibilities infuse contemporary funk to create a sort of hip-hop jazz." The Edmonton Journal determined that "the off-kilter drumming of Marvin 'Smitty' Smith and darting lines of Reggie Washington's electric bass set up a complicated maze for the snaking, urgent, unceasing curiosity of Coleman's alto sax."

The AllMusic review by Scott Yanow states: "Altoist Steve Coleman's CD is recommended as a good example of his music. The improvisations are dynamic, unpredictable, and quite original... Coleman, who wrote all but one of the originals, is the dominant force behind this often-disturbing but generally stimulating music".

Track listing
All compositions by Steve Coleman except as indicated
 "The X Format" - 6:45  
 "Twister" - 7:48  
 "Turbulence" - 6:22  
 "Beyond All We Know" - 4:10  
 "A Vial of Calm" - 7:06  
 "Black Phonemics" (David Gilmore, Steve Coleman) - 4:01  
 "Ghost Town" (Dave Mills, Steve Coleman) - 6:56  
 "Magneto" (James Weidman) - 2:52  
 "Cross-Fade" - 3:07  
 "Black Phonemics (Reprise)" - 1:50

Personnel
Steve Coleman - alto saxophone
James Weidman - piano, keyboards 
David Gilmore - guitar 
Reggie Washington - bass guitar 
Marvin "Smitty" Smith - drums
Cassandra Wilson - vocals (tracks 1, 4 & 5)
Dave Holland - double bass (tracks 2, 4 & 5) 
Dave Mills - voice (track 7)
Najma Akhtar - vocals (track 7)

References 

Steve Coleman albums
1991 albums
Novus Records albums